The Gods Laugh on Mondays (in Persian:  و خدايان دوشنبه‌ها مي‌خندند) was the first novel by an Iranian author with the pen name Reza Khoshnazar which was published in August 1995. It was a lurid chronicle of Iran in which the male protagonist is raped by his schoolmate, and can not be sure whether he liked it or not. He then marries a young woman who has an affair with his best friend. Eventually, the angst-ridden hero goes on a murder-suicide binge. This novel has been dedicated to Gregor Samsa, protagonist of novel The Metamorphosis by Franz Kafka. Reaction was hot, and some conservative papers called Gods a blasphemy. On the night of August 22, 1995, men arrived at the book publisher's shop identifying themselves as Islamic building inspectors. They set the building on fire. A head of Islamic propaganda (Ahmad Jannati) declared at Friday prayer that zealots are above the law. Reza Khoshnazar has published six other novels in Sweden.

References

1995 novels
Book burnings
Censorship in Iran
Iranian bildungsromans
Censored books